In Māori tradition, Kahutara was one of the great ocean-going, voyaging canoes that was used in the migrations that settled New Zealand.

See also
List of Māori waka

References 

Māori waka
Māori mythology